Shengan (also Romanized as Shengān and Shangan) is a village in Pachehlak-e Gharbi Rural District, in the Central District of Azna County, Lorestan Province, Iran. At the 2006 census, its population was 137, in 29 families.

References 

Towns and villages in Azna County